Yacouba Nasser Djiga (born 15 November 2002) is a Burkinabé professional footballer who plays as a defender for French  club Nîmes on loan from FC Basel in the Swiss Super League. He is a Burkina Faso international.

Club career
Djinga played his youth football with Vitesse FC in Burkina Faso. After having received various call-ups to their first team and having made his team debut during the last games of the 2018–19 season, he advanced to their squad in the 2019–20 season. Djinga played 14 games for them, scoring one goal, in the Deuxième Division the second tier of football in Burkina Faso. Despite the season remaining uncompleted due to the COVID-19 pandemic, because the team were league leaders, they won promotion to the Burkinabé Premier League. In the following season Djinga was regular starter in the team. He received a calls-up to the Burkina Faso U20 team and played four games for them in the 2021 Africa U-20 Cup of Nations.

During the transfer window in the summer of 2021, Djiga signed for Swiss top flight side FC Basel after receiving interest from Lille OSC in the French Ligue 1 and Belgian and Spanish clubs. Basel announced his signing on 19 June.

After having played in five test games, on 29 July 2021 Djinga debuted for FC Basel's first team during a 2–0 away win over Partizani in the second qualifying round of the 2021–22 UEFA Europa Conference League. Unfortunately Djinga injured himself during the game and was forced out for six weeks with a capsular ligament injury in the left ankle. He returned to the team on 19 September to play the Swiss Cup match against armature team FC Rorschach-Goldach.

On 24 October Djiga then played his Swiss Super League debut for his new club in the home game at St. Jakob-Park as Basel won 2–0 against Lugano and he played the entire game.

On 28 August 2022, Djiga joined Nîmes in France on a season-long loan.

International career
Djiga debuted for the Burkina Faso national team in a 5–0 friendly loss to Kosovo on 24 March 2022.

References

External links
 Profile on the Swiss Football League homepage
 Profile at FC Basel 
 
 Nasser Djiga at playmakerstats.com

2002 births
21st-century Burkinabé people
Living people
Burkinabé footballers
Burkina Faso under-20 international footballers
Association football defenders
FC Basel players
Nîmes Olympique players
Swiss Super League players
Burkinabé expatriate footballers
Expatriate footballers in Switzerland
Burkinabé expatriate sportspeople in Switzerland
Expatriate footballers in France
Burkinabé expatriate sportspeople in France